This is a list of 880 species in Cerceris, a genus of hymenopterans in the family Crabronidae.

Cerceris species

 Cerceris abac Fritz and Mariluis, 1976 i c g
 Cerceris abacta Shestakov, 1915 i c g
 Cerceris abatanensis Reyes, 1986 i c g
 Cerceris abdita Kazenas, 1984 i c g
 Cerceris abdominalis (Fabricius, 1804) i c g
 Cerceris abdominiglabra X. Li and Q. Li, 2014 i g
 Cerceris aborlana Tsuneki, 1992 i c g
 Cerceris abuensis R. Turner, 1912 i c g
 Cerceris acanthophila Cockerell, 1897 i c
 Cerceris acolhua de Saussure, 1867 i c g
 Cerceris acuta Radoszkowski, 1877 i c g
 Cerceris adae R. Turner, 1936 i c g
 Cerceris adelpha Kohl, 1887 i c g
 Cerceris aemula Arnold, 1945 i c g
 Cerceris aemuloides Leclercq, 1962 i c g
 Cerceris aequalis Provancher, 1888 i c g
 Cerceris aerata Kazenas, 1972 i c g
 Cerceris africanula Brauns, 1926 i c g
 Cerceris agnata R. Turner, 1912 i c g
 Cerceris alacris Mickel, 1918 i c g
 Cerceris alamos Scullen, 1972 i c g
 Cerceris alaope Banks, 1912 i c g
 Cerceris alastoroides R. Turner, 1914 i c g
 Cerceris albicincta Klug, 1845 i c g
 Cerceris albicolor Shestakov, 1918 i c g
 Cerceris albifrons F. Smith, 1856 i c g
 Cerceris albispinosa Arnold, 1952 i c g
 Cerceris alboatra Walker, 1871 i c g
 Cerceris albofasciata (Rossi, 1790) i c g
 Cerceris albolineata (Cameron, 1908) i c g
 Cerceris albopectoris Empey, 1973 i c g
 Cerceris albopicta F. Smith, 1873 i c g
 Cerceris alcyone Arnold, 1951 i c g
 Cerceris alexandrae F. Morawitz, 1889 i c g
 Cerceris amakosa Brauns, 1926 i c g
 Cerceris amamiensis Tsuneki, 1961 i c g
 Cerceris amathusia de Beaumont, 1958 i c g
 Cerceris amatoria Arnold, 1931 i c g
 Cerceris andalgalensis Fritz and Toro, 1969 i c g
 Cerceris andersoni R. Turner, 1918 i c g
 Cerceris andina Brèthes, 1910 i c g
 Cerceris andrei Gussakovskij, 1952 i c g
 Cerceris angelica Kazenas, 1977 i c g
 Cerceris angustata F. Morawitz, 1893 i c g
 Cerceris angustifrons Tsuneki, 1971 i c g
 Cerceris angustirostris Shestakov, 1918 i c g
 Cerceris annulata (Rossi, 1790) i c g
 Cerceris annuligera Taschenberg, 1875 i c g
 Cerceris ansa Shestakov, 1914 i c g
 Cerceris antennata F. Morawitz, 1890 i c g
 Cerceris anthicivora Evans, 1982 i c g
 Cerceris antilope Tsuneki, 1971 i c g
 Cerceris antipodes F. Smith, 1856 i c g
 Cerceris apakensis Tsuneki, 1961 i c g
 Cerceris apix Fritz and Mariluis, 1979 i c g
 Cerceris aquilina F. Smith, 1856 i c g
 Cerceris arechavaletai Brèthes, 1909 i c g
 Cerceris arelate Banks, 1912 i c g b
 Cerceris arenaria (Linnaeus, 1758) i c g
 Cerceris argentifrons Guérin-Méneville, 1844 i c g
 Cerceris argentina Brèthes, 1910 i c g
 Cerceris argentosa Shestakov, 1912 i c g
 Cerceris ariadne R. Turner, 1912 i c g
 Cerceris armata de Beaumont, 1959 i c g
 Cerceris armaticeps Cameron, 1910 i c g
 Cerceris armigera R. Turner, 1917 i c g
 Cerceris arnoldi Brauns, 1926 i c g
 Cerceris arrogans Arnold, 1931 i c g
 Cerceris associa Kohl, 1898 i c g
 Cerceris astarte Banks, 1913 i c g
 Cerceris astricta Reyes, 1988 i c g
 Cerceris aterrima Arnold, 1942 i c g
 Cerceris atramontensis Banks, 1913 i c g b
 Cerceris aurantiaca F. Smith, 1873 i c g
 Cerceris australis de Saussure, 1854 i c g
 Cerceris azteca de Saussure, 1867 i c g
 Cerceris bakeri Cameron, 1904 i c g
 Cerceris balteata Evans, 1982 i c g
 Cerceris baluchistanensis Cameron, 1907 i c g
 Cerceris banahawensis Reyes, 1986 i c g
 Cerceris bannisteri Empey, 1971 i c g
 Cerceris barchanica Kazenas, 1984 i c g
 Cerceris barnardi Brauns, 1926 i c g
 Cerceris basalis F. Smith, 1856 i c g
 Cerceris basimacula Cameron, 1907 i c g
 Cerceris beharensis Leclercq, 1967 i c g
 Cerceris bella Brèthes, 1910 i c g
 Cerceris belli R. Turner, 1912 i c g
 Cerceris bellona Mercet, 1914 i c g
 Cerceris berenice de Beaumont, 1966 i c g
 Cerceris betpakdalensis Kazenas, 1984 i c g
 Cerceris bicarinata Arnold, 1935 i c g
 Cerceris bicava Shestakov, 1917 i c g
 Cerceris bicincta Klug, 1835 i c g
 Cerceris bicornuta Guérin-Méneville, 1844 i c g b
 Cerceris bicuspidata Arnold, 1931 i c g
 Cerceris bidentula Maidl, 1926 i c g
 Cerceris bifasciata Guérin-Méneville, 1835 i c g
 Cerceris bifurcata Empey, 1970 i c g
 Cerceris bimaculata Cameron, 1905 i c g
 Cerceris binghami R. Turner, 1912 i c g
 Cerceris binodis Spinola, 1842 i c g
 Cerceris biplicatula Gussakovskij, 1938 i c g
 Cerceris bituberculata Tsuneki, 1963 i c g
 Cerceris blakei Cresson, 1865 i c g
 Cerceris boetica (Pérez, 1913) i c g
 Cerceris boharti Scullen, 1965 i c g
 Cerceris bohartiana Fritz and Toro, 1969 i c g
 Cerceris bolanica R. Turner, 1912 i c g
 Cerceris bolingeri Scullen, 1965 i c g
 Cerceris bolingeriana Krombein, 1979 i c g
 Cerceris bonaerensis Holmberg, 1903 i c g
 Cerceris borealis Mocsáry, 1901 i c g
 Cerceris boschmai van-der Vecht, 1964 g
 Cerceris boschmai van der Vecht, 1964 i c
 Cerceris bothavillensis Brauns, 1926 i c g
 Cerceris bothriophora Schletterer, 1887 i c g
 Cerceris bougainvillensis Tsuneki, 1968 i c g
 Cerceris boysi R. Turner, 1912 i c g
 Cerceris bracteata Eversmann, 1849 i c g
 Cerceris bradleyi Scullen, 1972 i c g
 Cerceris brandti Krombein, 1969 i c g
 Cerceris brethesi Fritz and Mariluis, 1979 i c g
 Cerceris brevibarbata Tsuneki, 1976 i c g
 Cerceris bridwelli Scullen, 1965 i c g
 Cerceris bucculata A. Costa, 1860 i c g
 Cerceris bulawayoensis Brauns, 1926 i c g
 Cerceris bulganensis Tsuneki, 1971 i c g
 Cerceris bupresticida Dufour, 1841 i c g
 Cerceris butleri Scullen, 1965 i c g
 Cerceris cacaloapana Scullen, 1972 i c g
 Cerceris caelebs Giner Marí, 1942 i c g
 Cerceris caiman Fritz and Mariluis, 1976 i c g
 Cerceris calida R. Turner, 1915 i c g
 Cerceris californica Cresson, 1865 i c g b
 Cerceris callani Krombein, 1972 i c g
 Cerceris calochorti Rohwer, 1908 i c g
 Cerceris campestris Holmberg, 1903 i c g
 Cerceris campicola Arnold, 1942 i c g
 Cerceris campsomeroides Arnold, 1951 i c g
 Cerceris capito Lepeletier, 1845 i c g
 Cerceris carinalis Pérez, 1905 i c g
 Cerceris carrascoi Fritz and Toro, 1973 i c g
 Cerceris carrizonensis Banks, 1915 i c g
 Cerceris caura Fritz and Mariluis, 1976 i c g
 Cerceris cavagnaroi Scullen, 1972 i c g
 Cerceris ceciliapanogadiae Reyes, 1986 i c g
 Cerceris celebensis Maidl, 1926 i c g
 Cerceris cerussata Shestakov, 1918 i c g
 Cerceris cerverae Giner Marí, 1941 i c g
 Cerceris chacoana Brèthes, 1910 i c g
 Cerceris changi Tsuneki, 1972 i c g
 Cerceris cheops de Beaumont, 1951 i c g
 Cerceris cheskesiana Giner Marí, 1945 i c g
 Cerceris chilensis Spinola, 1851 i c g
 Cerceris chirindensis Arnold, 1932 i c g
 Cerceris chiriquensis Cameron, 1890 i c g
 Cerceris chlorotica Spinola, 1839 i c g
 Cerceris chromatica Schletterer, 1887 i c g
 Cerceris chrysothemis R. Turner, 1912 i c g
 Cerceris circularis (Fabricius, 1804) i c g
 Cerceris circumcincta R. Turner, 1912 i c g
 Cerceris cisplatina Amarante, 2005 i c g
 Cerceris citrinella F. Smith, 1856 i c g
 Cerceris clarebaltazarae Reyes, 1986 i c g
 Cerceris clypearis de Saussure, 1887 i c g
 Cerceris clypeata Dahlbom, 1844 i c g b  (weevil wasp)
 Cerceris clytia de Beaumont, 1959 i c g
 Cerceris cochisi Scullen, 1965 i c g
 Cerceris cockerelli Viereck, 1903 i c g
 Cerceris coelicola Giner Marí, 1942 i c g
 Cerceris colorata Schletterer, 1889 i c g
 Cerceris comberi R. Turner, 1912 i c g
 Cerceris compacta Cresson, 1865 i c g
 Cerceris compar Cresson, 1865 i c g
 Cerceris completa Banks, 1919 i c g
 Cerceris concinna Brullé, 1839 i c g
 Cerceris confraga Shestakov, 1914 i c g
 Cerceris confusa Giner Marí, 1942 i c g
 Cerceris conica Shestakov, 1918 i c g
 Cerceris conifera Krombein, 1981 i c g
 Cerceris conifrons Mickel, 1916 i c g
 Cerceris constricta Guichard, 1993 i
 Cerceris constrictus Guichard, 1993 c g
 Cerceris contigua (Villers, 1789) i c g
 Cerceris convergens Viereck and Cockerell, 1904 i c g
 Cerceris cooperi Scullen, 1972 i c g
 Cerceris copiapoensis Sielfeld, 1971 i c g
 Cerceris cordillera V. Pérez and Toro, 1972 i c g
 Cerceris coreensis Tsuneki, 1961 i c g
 Cerceris cornigena Tsuneki, 1992 i c g
 Cerceris cornigera (Gmelin, 1790) i c g
 Cerceris cortezi Scullen, 1972 i c g
 Cerceris crandalli Scullen, 1965 i c g
 Cerceris crenulifer Kazenas, 1974 i c g
 Cerceris cribrosa Spinola, 1842 i c g
 Cerceris cristovalensis Krombein, 1969 i c g
 Cerceris crotonella Viereck and Cockerell, 1904 i c g
 Cerceris crucis Viereck and Cockerell, 1904 i c
 Cerceris cucullata Bingham, 1912 i c g
 Cerceris cuernavaca Scullen, 1972 i c g
 Cerceris cuica Fritz and Mariluis, 1976 i c g
 Cerceris cunnamulla Evans, 1982 i c g
 Cerceris cupes Shestakov, 1918 i c g
 Cerceris curculionicida Krombein, 1981 i c g
 Cerceris curita Fritz and Mariluis, 1979 i c g
 Cerceris curo Tsuneki, 1992 i c g
 Cerceris curvitarsis Schletterer, 1887 i c g
 Cerceris cuthbertsoni Arnold, 1946 i c g
 Cerceris cyclops Krombein, 1969 i c g
 Cerceris darrensis Cockerell, 1930 i c g
 Cerceris decorata Brèthes, 1910 i c g
 Cerceris dedariensis R. Turner, 1936 i c g
 Cerceris dejecta Arnold, 1931 i c g
 Cerceris delhiensis Coumar and Dey, 2008 i c g
 Cerceris dentata Cameron, 1890 i c g
 Cerceris dentifrons Cresson, 1865 i c g
 Cerceris dentiventris Arnold, 1945 i c g
 Cerceris deserta Say, 1824 i c g
 Cerceris deserticola F. Morawitz, 1890 i c g
 Cerceris diabolica Giner Marí, 1942 i c g
 Cerceris diana Kazenas, 1984 i c g
 Cerceris difficilis Guichard, 1993 i c g
 Cerceris dilatata Spinola, 1842 i c g
 Cerceris diodonta Schletterer, 1887 i c g
 Cerceris dione Fritz, 1960 i c g
 Cerceris discrepans Brauns, 1926 i c g
 Cerceris dispar Dahlbom, 1845 i c g
 Cerceris dissecta (Fabricius, 1798) i c g
 Cerceris dissona Arnold, 1955 i c g
 Cerceris distinguenda Shestakov, 1918 i c g
 Cerceris doederleini W. Schulz, 1905 i c g
 Cerceris dogonensis Krombein, 1974 i c g
 Cerceris dominicana Brauns, 1926 i c g
 Cerceris dondoensis Brauns, 1926 i c g
 Cerceris dorsalis Eversmann, 1849 i c g
 Cerceris dowi Tsuneki, 1968 i c g
 Cerceris downesivora R.Turner, 1912 i c g
 Cerceris dreisbachi Scullen, 1972 i c g
 Cerceris duchesnei Arnold, 1945 i c g
 Cerceris duplicata Brèthes, 1910 i c g
 Cerceris durango Scullen, 1972 i c g
 Cerceris dusmeti Giner Marí, 1941 i c g
 Cerceris eburneofasciata Brauns, 1926 i c g
 Cerceris echo Mickel, 1916 i c g
 Cerceris edolata Shestakov, 1912 i c g
 Cerceris egena Arnold, 1931 i c g
 Cerceris electra Arnold, 1951 i c g
 Cerceris elegans Evermann, 1849 i c
 Cerceris elizabethae Bingham, 1897 i c g
 Cerceris emeryana Gribodo, 1894 i c g
 Cerceris enodans Brèthes, 1910 i c g
 Cerceris ephippium R. Turner, 1912 i c g
 Cerceris errata Shestakov, 1918 i c g
 Cerceris erronea Giner Marí, 1942 i c g
 Cerceris eryngii Marquet, 1875 i c g
 Cerceris erynnis Arnold, 1931 i c g
 Cerceris erythrogaster Kazenas, 1972 i c g
 Cerceris erythropoda Cameron, 1890 i c g
 Cerceris erythrosoma Schletterer, 1887 i c g
 Cerceris erythroura Cameron, 1908 i c g
 Cerceris escalante Evans, 2002 i c g
 Cerceris escalerae Giner Marí, 1941 i c g
 Cerceris eucharis Schletterer, 1887 i c g
 Cerceris euchroma R. Turner, 1910 i c g
 Cerceris eulalia Brauns, 1926 i c g
 Cerceris eumolpicida Krombein, 1981 i c g
 Cerceris eungella Evans, 1982 i c g
 Cerceris euryanthe Kohl, 1888 i c g
 Cerceris evansi Scullen, 1972 i c g
 Cerceris eversmanni W. Schulz, 1912 i c g
 Cerceris exleyae Evans, 1982 i c g
 Cerceris expleta Brèthes, 1910 i c g
 Cerceris expulsa R. Turner, 1920 i c g
 Cerceris faceta Arnold, 1951 i c g
 Cerceris falcifera Tsuneki, 1961 i c g
 Cerceris farri Scullen, 1970 i c g
 Cerceris fastidiosa R. Turner, 1912 i c g
 Cerceris femurrubrum Viereck and Cockerell, 1904 i c g
 Cerceris ferocior R. Turner, 1912 i c g
 Cerceris ferox F. Smith, 1856 i c g
 Cerceris ferruginea Brèthes, 1910 i c g
 Cerceris ferusa Kazenas, 1979 i c g
 Cerceris festiva Cresson, 1865 i c g
 Cerceris fimbriata (Rossi, 1790) i c g
 Cerceris fingo Brauns, 1926 i c g
 Cerceris finitima Cresson, 1865 i c g
 Cerceris fischeri Spinola, 1839 i c g
 Cerceris fitzgeraldi Empey, 1973 i c g
 Cerceris flavicornis Brullé, 1833 i c g
 Cerceris flavida Cameron, 1890 i c g
 Cerceris flavifrons F. Smith, 1856 i c g
 Cerceris flavilabris (Fabricius, 1793) i c g
 Cerceris flaviventris Vander Linden, 1829 i c g
 Cerceris flavocostalis Cresson, 1865 i c g
 Cerceris flavofasciata H. Smith, 1908 i c g
 Cerceris flavomaculata Cameron, 1890 c g
 Cerceris flavonasuta Arnold, 1951 i c g
 Cerceris flavopicta F. Smith, 1856 i c g
 Cerceris flavoplagiata Cameron, 1905 i c g
 Cerceris flavotrochanterica Rohwer, 1912 i c g
 Cerceris fletcheri R. Turner, 1912 i c g
 Cerceris fluvialis F. Smith, 1873 i c g
 Cerceris fodiens Eversmann, 1849 i c g
 Cerceris forficata Evans, 1982 i c g
 Cerceris formicaria Eschscholtz, 1822 i c g
 Cerceris formidolosa de Saussure, 1890 i c g
 Cerceris formosa Dahlbom, 1845 i c g
 Cerceris formosana Strand, 1913 i c g
 Cerceris forticula Arnold, 1955 i c g
 Cerceris fortin Scullen, 1972 i c g
 Cerceris fortinata Cameron, 1902 i c g
 Cerceris freymuthi Radoszkowski, 1877 i c g
 Cerceris frigida Mocsáry, 1901 i c g
 Cerceris froggatti R. Turner, 1912 i c g
 Cerceris frontata Say, 1823 i c g b
 Cerceris fuliginosa F. Smith, 1856 i c g
 Cerceris fulva Mocsáry, 1883 i c g
 Cerceris fulvipes Eversmann, 1849 i c g
 Cerceris fulviventris Guérin-Méneville, 1844 i c g
 Cerceris fumipennis Say, 1837 i c g b
 Cerceris fumosipennis Strand, 1910 i c g
 Cerceris furcata F. Morawitz, 1890 i c g
 Cerceris furcifera Schletterer, 1887 i c g
 Cerceris gaetula de Beaumont, 1951 i c g
 Cerceris galathea de Beaumont, 1959 i c g
 Cerceris gallienii Arnold, 1945 i c g
 Cerceris gandarai Rohwer, 1912 i c g
 Cerceris garleppi Schrottky, 1911 i c g
 Cerceris gaudebunda Holmberg, 1903 i c g
 Cerceris gaullei Brèthes, 1920 i c g
 Cerceris gayi Spinola, 1851 i c g
 Cerceris genadentula Reyes, 1986 i c g
 Cerceris geneana A. Costa, 1867 i c g
 Cerceris gibbosa Sickman, 1894 i c g
 Cerceris gilberti R. Turner, 1916 i c g
 Cerceris gilesi R. Turner, 1910 i c g
 Cerceris gineri de Beaumont, 1951 i c g
 Cerceris globulosa (Fourcroy, 1785) i c
 Cerceris gloria Reyes, 1986 i c g
 Cerceris gnarina Banks, 1913 i c g
 Cerceris goddardi Cockerell, 1930 i c g
 Cerceris gomphocarpi Banks, 1911 i c g
 Cerceris gracilis Kazenas, 1984 i c g
 Cerceris grana Shestakov, 1918 i c g
 Cerceris grandis Banks, 1913 i c g
 Cerceris greeni R. Turner, 1912 i c g
 Cerceris grisselli G. Ferguson, 1983 i c g
 Cerceris guigliae Giordani Soika, 1942 i c g
 Cerceris gusenleitneri K. Schmidt, 2000 i c g
 Cerceris hackeriana Cockerell, 1930 i c g
 Cerceris halone Banks, 1912 i c g b
 Cerceris hameri Guichard, 1993 i c g
 Cerceris hamiltoni Arnold, 1931 i c g
 Cerceris haramaiae Arnold, 1951 i c g
 Cerceris harbinensis Tsuneki, 1961 i c g
 Cerceris hathor Pulawski, 1983 i c g
 Cerceris hatuey Alayo Dalmau, 1968 i c g
 Cerceris hausa Arnold, 1931 i c g
 Cerceris herbsti Empey, 1971 i c g
 Cerceris hermani Fritz, 1990 i c g
 Cerceris hexadonta Strand, 1913 i c g
 Cerceris hidalgo Scullen, 1972 i c g
 Cerceris hilaris F. Smith, 1856 i c g
 Cerceris hilbrandi van-der Vecht, 1964 g
 Cerceris hilbrandi van der Vecht, 1964 i c
 Cerceris hildebrandti de Saussure, 1891 i c g
 Cerceris histerisnica (Spinola, 1839) i c g
 Cerceris histrionica Klug, 1845 i c g
 Cerceris hohlbecki Shestakov, 1914 i c g
 Cerceris holconota Cameron, 1905 i c g
 Cerceris hortivaga Kohl, 1880 i c g
 Cerceris horus Arnold, 1931 i c g
 Cerceris howardevansi Genaro, 2004 i c g
 Cerceris huachuca Banks, 1947 i c g
 Cerceris hurdi Scullen, 1972 i c g
 Cerceris ibericella Leclercq, 1979 i c g
 Cerceris icta Shestakov, 1918 i c g
 Cerceris iliensis Kazenas, 1972 i c g
 Cerceris illustris Arnold, 1931 i c g
 Cerceris imitator F. Smith, 1856 i c g
 Cerceris impercepta de Beaumont, 1950 i c g
 Cerceris imperialis de Saussure, 1867 i c g
 Cerceris inara de Beaumont, 1967 i c g
 Cerceris inconspicua Arnold, 1931 i c g
 Cerceris indica (Thunberg, 1815) c g
 Cerceris indicus (Thunberg, 1815) i
 Cerceris inexorabilis R. Turner, 1912 i c g
 Cerceris inexpectata R. Turner, 1908 i c g
 Cerceris infumata Maidl, 1926 i c g
 Cerceris iniqua Kohl, 1894 i c g
 Cerceris insignita Arnold, 1951 i c g
 Cerceris insolita Cresson, 1865 i c g b
 Cerceris integra F. Morawitz, 1894 i c g
 Cerceris interrupta (Panzer, 1799) i c g
 Cerceris interstincta (Fabricius, 1798) i c g
 Cerceris intricata F. Smith, 1856 i c g
 Cerceris intrusa Krombein, 1981 i c g
 Cerceris invalida Kohl, 1906 i c g
 Cerceris invita R. Turner, 1912 i c g
 Cerceris irene Banks, 1912 i c g
 Cerceris iridis Evans, 1982 i c g
 Cerceris isis Arnold, 1931 i c g
 Cerceris isolde Banks, 1947 i c g
 Cerceris ivannikovi Kazenas, 1984 i c g
 Cerceris jakowleffi Kohl, 1898 i c g
 Cerceris japonica Ashmead, 1904 i c g
 Cerceris jashenkoi Kazenas, 2006 i c g
 Cerceris jatahyna Brèthes, 1920 i c g
 Cerceris jeiti Genaro, 2009 i c g
 Cerceris jucunda Cresson, 1873 i c g
 Cerceris kansuensis Shestakov, 1934 i c g
 Cerceris karimuiensis Krombein, 1969 i c g
 Cerceris kasachstanica Kazenas, 1972 i c g
 Cerceris kaszabi Tsuneki, 1971 i c g
 Cerceris katangae Brauns, 1914 i c g
 Cerceris kedahae Pagden, 1934 i c g
 Cerceris kennicottii Cresson, 1865 i c g b
 Cerceris kilimandjaroensis Cameron, 1908 i c g
 Cerceris kirbyi Bingham, 1897 i c g
 Cerceris klugii F. Smith, 1856 i c g
 Cerceris kobrowi Brauns, 1926 i c g
 Cerceris kohlii Schletterer, 1887 i c g
 Cerceris kokuevi Shestakov, 1912 i c g
 Cerceris koma Tsuneki, 1961 i c g
 Cerceris koryo Tsuneki, 1961 i c g
 Cerceris koshantshikovi Shestakov, 1914 i c g
 Cerceris kozlovi Shestakov, 1918 i c g
 Cerceris krombeini Scullen, 1965 i c g
 Cerceris krugi Dewitz, 1881 i c g
 Cerceris kumamotonis Tsuneki, 1978 i c g
 Cerceris kurzenkoi Kazenas, 1980 i c g
 Cerceris kuznetzovi Kazenas, 1984 i c g
 Cerceris kwangtsehiana Giner Marí, 1942 i c g
 Cerceris labeculata R. Turner, 1908 i c g
 Cerceris labiata (Olivier, 1792) i c g
 Cerceris lacinia Tsuneki, 1961 i c g
 Cerceris laeta (Fabricius, 1793) i c g
 Cerceris laevigata F. Smith, 1856 i c g
 Cerceris lama R. Turner, 1912 i c g
 Cerceris lamarquensis Fritz and Toro, 1969 i c g
 Cerceris lanaonis Tsuneki, 1992 i c g
 Cerceris languida Cameron, 1905 i c g
 Cerceris larissae K. Schmidt, 2000 i c g
 Cerceris lateridentata Arnold, 1945 i c g
 Cerceris laterifurcata Empey, 1973 i c g
 Cerceris laterimaculata Empey, 1973 i c g
 Cerceris lateriproducta Mochi, 1939 i c g
 Cerceris latibalteata Cameron, 1904 i c g
 Cerceris latiberbis Tsuneki, 1968 i c g
 Cerceris laticincta Lepeletier, 1845 i c g
 Cerceris latidens Cameron, 1902 i c g
 Cerceris latifrons Bingham, 1902 i c g
 Cerceris lativentris Gussakovskij, 1938 i c g
 Cerceris latro F. Smith, 1856 i c g
 Cerceris lauta Sk. Yamane and Tano, 1995 i c g
 Cerceris laxata Shestakov, 1918 i c g
 Cerceris leucochroa Schletterer, 1887 i c g
 Cerceris leytensis Tsuneki, 1992 i c g
 Cerceris listrognatha Evans, 1982 i c g
 Cerceris ljubae Fritz, 1990 i c g
 Cerceris lobaba W.F. Kirby, 1900 i c g
 Cerceris longilabris Arnold, 1946 i c g
 Cerceris longitudinalis Giordani Soika, 1942 i c g
 Cerceris longiuscula Arnold, 1951 i c g
 Cerceris luchti van-der Vecht, 1964 g
 Cerceris luchti van der Vecht, 1964 i c
 Cerceris luculenta Evans, 1982 i c g
 Cerceris lunata A. Costa, 1867 i c g
 Cerceris lunigera Dahlbom, 1845 i c g
 Cerceris luthpia Kazenas, 1980 i
 Cerceris lutphia Kazenas, 1980 c g
 Cerceris lutzi Scullen, 1972 i c g
 Cerceris luxuriosa Dahlbom, 1845 i c g
 Cerceris luzonensis Crawford, 1910 i c g
 Cerceris lynchii Brèthes, 1910 i c g
 Cerceris macalanga Brauns, 1926 i c g
 Cerceris macswaini Scullen, 1965 i c g
 Cerceris macula (Fabricius, 1804) i c g
 Cerceris maculata Radoszkowski, 1877 i c g
 Cerceris maculicrus de Beaumont, 1967 i c g
 Cerceris manca Fritz and Mariluis, 1979 i c g
 Cerceris manchuriana Tsuneki, 1961 i c g
 Cerceris mandibularis Patton, 1881 i c g
 Cerceris manflava Tsuneki, 1971 i c g
 Cerceris manifesta Arnold, 1952 i c g
 Cerceris manjoni Fritz and Mariluis, 1976 i c g
 Cerceris maracandica Radoszkowski, 1877 i c g
 Cerceris margarita de Beaumont, 1966 i c g
 Cerceris marginata F. Smith, 1856 i c g
 Cerceris marginula Dalla Torre, 1897 i c g
 Cerceris maritima de Saussure, 1867 i c g
 Cerceris mariusi Fritz, 1989 i c g
 Cerceris martialis Giner Marí, 1942 i c g
 Cerceris mastogaster F. Smith, 1856 i c g
 Cerceris mazimba Brauns, 1926 i c g
 Cerceris media Klug, 1835 i c g
 Cerceris meditata Shestakov, 1918 i c g
 Cerceris megacantha Evans, 1982 i c g
 Cerceris megacephala Brèthes, 1913 i c g
 Cerceris melaina R. Turner, 1912 i c g
 Cerceris melanthe Banks, 1947 i c g
 Cerceris mellicula R. Turner, 1912 i c g
 Cerceris mendesensis Brèthes, 1920 i c g
 Cerceris mendozana Brèthes, 1913 i c g
 Cerceris menkei Fritz and Toro, 1969 i c g
 Cerceris menoni Coumar and Dey, 2003 i c g
 Cerceris merope Arnold, 1951 i c g
 Cerceris merredinensis R. Turner, 1936 i c g
 Cerceris mesopotamica Brèthes, 1913 i c g
 Cerceris metatarsalis R. Turner, 1926 i c g
 Cerceris mexicana de Saussure, 1867 i c g
 Cerceris micropunctata Shestakov, 1918 i c g
 Cerceris militaris Dahlbom, 1844 i c g
 Cerceris milkoi Kazenas, 2000 i c g
 Cerceris millironi Krombein, 1969 i c g
 Cerceris mimica Cresson, 1873 i c g
 Cerceris minax Mickel, 1918 c g
 Cerceris mindanaonis Tsuneki, 1992 i c g
 Cerceris minuscula R. Turner, 1910 i c g
 Cerceris minutior Maidl, 1924 i c g
 Cerceris minutissima Maidl, 1924 i c g
 Cerceris misoolensis Krombein, 1969 i c g
 Cerceris mitjaevi Kazenas, 2001 i c g
 Cerceris moczari Tsuneki, 1971 i c g
 Cerceris modica Amarante, 2002 i c g
 Cerceris moestissima Guiglia, 1941 i c g
 Cerceris moggionis Arnold, 1951 i c g
 Cerceris monocera Kohl, 1898 i c g
 Cerceris montealban Scullen, 1972 i c g
 Cerceris montezuma Cameron, 1890 i c g
 Cerceris monticola Arnold, 1931 i c g
 Cerceris morawitzi Mocsáry, 1883 i c g
 Cerceris mordax Krombein, 1969 i c g
 Cerceris morelos Scullen, 1972 i c g
 Cerceris morrae Strand, 1910 i c g
 Cerceris mossambica Gribodo, 1895 i c g
 Cerceris moyanoi Holmberg, 1903 i c g
 Cerceris multiguttata R. Turner, 1908 i c g
 Cerceris multipicta F. Smith, 1873 i c g
 Cerceris nana Shestakov, 1918 i c g
 Cerceris narcisoi Fritz, 1983 i c g
 Cerceris nargisa Kazenas, 1984 i c g
 Cerceris nasidens Schletterer, 1887 i c g
 Cerceris natalensis de Saussure, 1867 i c g
 Cerceris neahminax Scullen, 1965 i c g
 Cerceris nebrascensis H. Smith, 1908 i c g
 Cerceris nebulosa Cameron, 1890 i c g
 Cerceris neghelliensis Guiglia, 1939 i c g
 Cerceris nenicra de Saussure, 1887 i c g
 Cerceris nenitroidea Bischoff, 1913 i c g
 Cerceris neogenita W. Schulz, 1906 i c g
 Cerceris nephthys Arnold, 1931 i c g
 Cerceris nigra Ashmead, 1900 i c g
 Cerceris nigrescens F. Smith, 1856 i c g b
 Cerceris nigriceps F. Smith, 1873 i c g
 Cerceris nigrosa Fritz, 1989 i c g
 Cerceris nigrostoma Brauns, 1926 i c g
 Cerceris nikolaji Kazenas, 1980 i c g
 Cerceris nipponensis Tsuneki, 1961 i c g
 Cerceris nitidoides G. Ferguson, 1984 i c g
 Cerceris nitrariae Morice, 1911 i c g
 Cerceris nortina Fritz and Toro, 1969 i c g
 Cerceris nugax Arnold, 1931 i c g
 Cerceris oaxaca Scullen, 1972 i c g
 Cerceris obo Tsuneki, 1971 i c g
 Cerceris obregon Scullen, 1972 i c g
 Cerceris obscura Schletterer, 1887 i c g
 Cerceris obsoleta Cameron, 1890 i c g
 Cerceris occipitomaculata Packard, 1866 i c g
 Cerceris oceania de Beaumont, 1951 i c g
 Cerceris odontophora Schletterer, 1887 i c g
 Cerceris okumurai Tsuneki, 1968 i c g
 Cerceris opposita F. Smith, 1873 i c g
 Cerceris orangiae Brauns, 1926 i c g
 Cerceris oraniensis Brauns, 1926 i c g
 Cerceris orientalis F. Smith, 1856 i c g
 Cerceris osculata Evans, 1982 i c g
 Cerceris osiris Arnold, 1931 i c g
 Cerceris otomia de Saussure, 1867 i c g
 Cerceris palawanensis Tsuneki, 1976 i c g
 Cerceris paleata de Saussure, 1891 i c g
 Cerceris pallidula Morice, 1897 i c g
 Cerceris palmetorum de Beaumont, 1951 i c g
 Cerceris panama Scullen, 1972 i c g
 Cerceris papuensis Krombein, 1969 i c g
 Cerceris paratristis Coumar and Dey, 2003 i c g
 Cerceris paulista Fritz, 1983 i c g
 Cerceris paupercula Holmberg, 1903 i c g
 Cerceris pava Kazenas, 1984 i c g
 Cerceris pearstonensis Cameron, 1905 i c g
 Cerceris pectinata Shestakov, 1918 i c g
 Cerceris pedetes Kohl, 1887 i c g
 Cerceris pekingensis Tsuneki, 1961 i c g
 Cerceris penai Fritz and Toro, 1969 i c g
 Cerceris pentadonta Cameron, 1890 i c g
 Cerceris perboscii Guérin-Méneville, 1844 i c g
 Cerceris perfida de Saussure, 1890 i c g
 Cerceris perkinsi R. Turner, 1910 i c g
 Cerceris perspicua Holmberg, 1903 i c g
 Cerceris petiolata de Saussure, 1891 i c g
 Cerceris pharaonum Kohl, 1898 i c g
 Cerceris pharetrigera Shestakov, 1923 i c g
 Cerceris picta Dahlbom, 1844 i c g
 Cerceris pictifacies Brauns, 1926 i c g
 Cerceris pictiventris Dahlbom, 1845 i c g
 Cerceris picturata Taschenberg, 1875 i c g
 Cerceris placida Arnold, 1931 i c g
 Cerceris placita Arnold, 1931 i c g
 Cerceris pleurispina de Beaumont, 1959 i c g
 Cerceris podagrosa Kohl, 1906 i c g
 Cerceris pollens Schletterer, 1887 i c g
 Cerceris polybioides Pendlebury, 1927 i c g
 Cerceris ponderosa Brèthes, 1920 i c g
 Cerceris potanini Shestakov, 1918 i c g
 Cerceris povolnyi de Beaumont, 1970 i c g
 Cerceris praedura R. Turner, 1908 i c g
 Cerceris priesneri Mochi, 1939 i c g
 Cerceris proboscidea Holmberg, 1903 i c g
 Cerceris prominens Banks, 1912 i c g
 Cerceris protea R. Turner, 1912 i c g
 Cerceris proteles Brauns, 1926 i c g
 Cerceris pruinosa Morice, 1897 i c g
 Cerceris przewalskii Shestakov, 1918 i c g
 Cerceris psamathe Banks, 1912 i c g
 Cerceris pseudoerythrocephala von Schulthess, 1926 i c g
 Cerceris pseudoflavescens Shestakov, 1926 i c g
 Cerceris pseudotridentata Maidl, 1926 i c g
 Cerceris pucilii Radoszkowski, 1869 i c g
 Cerceris pulchella Klug, 1845 i c g
 Cerceris pulchra Cameron, 1890 i c g
 Cerceris pygmaea de Saussure, 1867 i c g
 Cerceris quadricincta (Panzer, 1799) i c g
 Cerceris quadricolor F. Morawitz, 1889 i c g
 Cerceris quadricornis Gussakovskij, 1938 i c g
 Cerceris quadridentata Arnold, 1931 i g
 Cerceris quadrifasciata (Panzer, 1799) i c g
 Cerceris queretaro Scullen, 1972 i c g
 Cerceris querula Kohl, 1906 i c g
 Cerceris quettaensis Cameron, 1907 i c g
 Cerceris quinquefasciata (Rossi, 1792) i c g
 Cerceris radjamandalae van-der Vecht, 1964 g
 Cerceris radjamandalae van der Vecht, 1964 i c
 Cerceris raptor F. Smith, 1856 i c g
 Cerceris rasoherinae Arnold, 1945 i c g
 Cerceris raymenti R. Turner, 1936 i c g
 Cerceris reginula Brauns, 1926 i c g
 Cerceris reicula Krombein, 1969 i c g
 Cerceris rejecta R. Turner, 1917 i c g
 Cerceris renominata R. Turner, 1917 i c g
 Cerceris repraesentans R. Turner, 1919 i c g
 Cerceris reversa F. Smith, 1873 i c g
 Cerceris rhinoceros Kohl, 1888 i c g
 Cerceris rhodesiae Brauns, 1926 i c g
 Cerceris rhodesiensis Empey, 1971 i c g
 Cerceris rhois Rohwer, 1908 i c g
 Cerceris rigida F. Smith, 1856 i c g
 Cerceris rixosa F. Smith, 1856 i c g
 Cerceris rohweri G. Ferguson, 1983 i c g
 Cerceris ropalidioides Evans, 1982 i c g
 Cerceris rossica Shestakov, 1914 i c g
 Cerceris rostrifera Brauns, 1926 i c g
 Cerceris rothi Giner Marí, 1942 i c g
 Cerceris rothneyi Cameron, 1890 i c g
 Cerceris rozeni Scullen, 1971 i c g
 Cerceris rubida (Jurine, 1807) i c g
 Cerceris rubigina X. Li and Q. Li, 2011 i c g
 Cerceris rufiabdominalis Wu and Zhou, 1996 i c g
 Cerceris ruficapoides Strand, 1910 i c g
 Cerceris ruficauda Cameron, 1905 i c g
 Cerceris ruficeps F. Smith, 1873 i c g
 Cerceris ruficornis (Fabricius, 1793) i c g
 Cerceris rufimana Taschenberg, 1875 i c g
 Cerceris rufinoda Cresson, 1865 i c g
 Cerceris rufiscutis Cameron, 1908 i c g
 Cerceris rufiventris Lepeletier, 1845 i c g
 Cerceris rufocincta Gerstäcker, 1858 i c g
 Cerceris rufopicta F. Smith, 1856 i c g b
 Cerceris rugosa F. Smith, 1856 i c g
 Cerceris rugulosa Schrottky, 1909 i c g
 Cerceris rustica Taschenberg, 1875 i c g
 Cerceris rutila Spinola, 1839 i c g
 Cerceris rybyensis (Linnaeus, 1771) i c g
 Cerceris sabulosa (Panzer, 1799) i c g
 Cerceris saegeri Empey, 1970 i c g
 Cerceris saevissima F. Smith, 1856 i c g
 Cerceris sahlbergi Shestakov, 1918 i c g
 Cerceris saishuensis Tsuneki, 1968 i c g
 Cerceris salai Giner Marí, 1945 i c g
 Cerceris samarensis Tsuneki, 1968 i c g
 Cerceris sanluis Fritz and Toro, 1969 i c g
 Cerceris saussurei Radoszkowski, 1877 i c g
 Cerceris scapularis Schletterer, 1887 i c g
 Cerceris schaeuffelei de Beaumont, 1970 i c g
 Cerceris schariniensis Kazenas, 1972 i c g
 Cerceris schlettereri Radoszkowski, 1888 i c g
 Cerceris schmiedeknechti Kohl, 1898 c g
 Cerceris schoutedeni Brauns, 1914 i c g
 Cerceris schultzei Bischoff, 1913 i c g
 Cerceris scutifera Shestakov, 1914 i c g
 Cerceris sedula Evans, 1982 i c g
 Cerceris seleucos K. Schmidt, 2000 i c g
 Cerceris semenovi Shestakov, 1914 i c g
 Cerceris semilunata Radoszkowski, 1870 i c g
 Cerceris seminigra Taschenberg, 1875 c g
 Cerceris seminingra Taschenberg, 1875 i
 Cerceris semipetiolata de Saussure, 1867 i c g
 Cerceris sepulcralis F. Smith, 1858 i c g
 Cerceris serrana Fritz, 1989 i c g
 Cerceris severini Kohl, 1913 i c g
 Cerceris sexta Say, 1837 i c g
 Cerceris sextoides Banks, 1947 i c g b
 Cerceris seyrigi Arnold, 1945 i c g
 Cerceris shelfordi R. Turner, 1912 i c g
 Cerceris shestakovi Gussakovskij, 1952 i c g
 Cerceris shestakoviana Gussakovskij, 1952 i c g
 Cerceris shirozui Tsuneki, 1968 i c g
 Cerceris sibirica F. Morawitz, 1892 i c g
 Cerceris siccata Evans, 1982 i c g
 Cerceris silvana Schletterer, 1887 i c g
 Cerceris simulans de Saussure, 1867 i c g
 Cerceris sinaitica de Beaumont, 1951 i c g
 Cerceris sinensis F. Smith, 1856 i c g
 Cerceris sirdariensis Radoszkowski, 1877 i c g
 Cerceris sobo Yasumatsu and Okabe, 1936 i c g
 Cerceris sokotrae Kohl, 1906 i c g
 Cerceris solitaria Dahlbom, 1845 i c g
 Cerceris somalica Arnold, 1940 i c g
 Cerceris somotorensis Balthasar, 1956 i c g
 Cerceris songhai Guichard, 1993 i c g
 Cerceris sororcula Brèthes, 1913 i c g
 Cerceris spathulifera Brèthes, 1913 i c g
 Cerceris spatulata Reyes, 1986 i c g
 Cerceris specifica R. Turner, 1912 i c g
 Cerceris spectabilis Radoszkowski, 1886 i c g
 Cerceris spectrum Arnold, 1936 i c g
 Cerceris specularis A. Costa, 1867 i c g
 Cerceris spilota Evans, 1982 i c g
 Cerceris spinaea de Beaumont, 1970 i c g
 Cerceris spinicaudata Cameron, 1905 i c g
 Cerceris spinifera Kazenas, 1974 i c g
 Cerceris spiniger Rohwer, 1919 i c g
 Cerceris spinipectus F. Smith, 1856 i c g
 Cerceris spinipleuris R. Turner, 1918 i c g
 Cerceris spirans de Saussure, 1892 i c g
 Cerceris splendidissima Giordani Soika, 1942 i c g
 Cerceris squamulifera Mickel, 1916 i c g
 Cerceris stefanii Ed. André, 1889 i c g
 Cerceris stella Shestakov, 1914 i c g
 Cerceris sternodonta Gussakovskij, 1938 i c g
 Cerceris stevensoni Brauns, 1926 i c g
 Cerceris stoeckleini Giner Marí, 1942 i c g
 Cerceris storeyi Evans, 1988 i c g
 Cerceris straminea Dufour, 1854 i c g
 Cerceris strandi Giner Marí, 1943 i c g
 Cerceris stratiotes Schletterer, 1887 i c g
 Cerceris stratonike K. Schmidt, 2000 i c g
 Cerceris striata F. Smith, 1873 i c g
 Cerceris strigosa Cameron, 1890 i c g
 Cerceris sulphurea Cameron, 1890 i c g
 Cerceris sungari Tsuneki, 1961 i c g
 Cerceris supraconica Tsuneki, 1961 i c g
 Cerceris synagroides R. Turner, 1912 i c g
 Cerceris szechuana Tsuneki, 1968 i c g
 Cerceris tango Shestakov, 1918 i c g
 Cerceris tenuiventris Arnold, 1958 i c g
 Cerceris tenuivittata Dufour, 1849 i c g
 Cerceris tepaneca de Saussure, 1867 i c g
 Cerceris teranishii Sato, 1927 i c g
 Cerceris tetradonta Cameron, 1890 i c g
 Cerceris texana Scullen, 1964 i c g
 Cerceris tibialis Brèthes, 1910 i c g
 Cerceris tienchiao Tsuneki, 1968 i c g
 Cerceris tiendang Tsuneki, 1961 i c g
 Cerceris tingi Fritz and Mariluis, 1976 i c g
 Cerceris tinnula Gussakovskij, 1952 i c g
 Cerceris tolteca de Saussure, 1867 i c g b
 Cerceris tomiyamai Sk. Yamane and Tano, 1995 i c g
 Cerceris tonkinensis R. Turner, 1919 i c g
 Cerceris townsendi Viereck and Cockerell, 1904 i c g
 Cerceris toxopeusi Krombein, 1969 i c g
 Cerceris triangularis Reyes, 1986 i c g
 Cerceris triangulata Cresson, 1865 i c g
 Cerceris trica Fritz and Mariluis, 1976 i c g
 Cerceris trichionota Cameron, 1908 i c g
 Cerceris trichiosoma Cameron, 1890 i c g
 Cerceris trichobunda Strand, 1913 i c g
 Cerceris tricolor F. Smith, 1856 i c g
 Cerceris tricolorata Spinola, 1839 i c g
 Cerceris tridentata Maidl, 1926 i c g
 Cerceris trifasciata F. Smith, 1856 i c g
 Cerceris trifida Evans, 1982 i c g
 Cerceris trimaculata Maidl, 1926 i c g
 Cerceris trinitaria Alayo Dalmau, 1968 i c g
 Cerceris tristior Morice, 1911 i c g
 Cerceris truncata Cameron, 1890 i c g
 Cerceris tshontandae Arnold, 1946 i c g
 Cerceris tuberculata (de Villers, 1789) i c g
 Cerceris tucuman Fritz and Toro, 1974 i c g
 Cerceris tumulorum F. Smith, 1865 i c g
 Cerceris turanica Kazenas, 1980 i c g
 Cerceris turkmenica Kazenas, 1984 i c g
 Cerceris turneri Shestakov, 1918 i c g
 Cerceris tyrannica F. Smith, 1856 i c g
 Cerceris ugandensis Arnold, 1931 i c g
 Cerceris ulcerosa Arnold, 1936 i c g
 Cerceris umbelliferarum Schrottky, 1911 i c g
 Cerceris umbinifera Maidl, 1926 i c g
 Cerceris umhlangae Arnold, 1942 i c g
 Cerceris uncifera Arnold, 1931 i c g
 Cerceris uncta Arnold, 1931 i c g
 Cerceris unidentata F. Morawitz, 1890 i c g
 Cerceris unifasciata F. Smith, 1856 i c g
 Cerceris unispinosa R. Turner, 1917 i c g
 Cerceris uvarovi Kazenas, 1984 i c g
 Cerceris vagans Radoszkowski, 1877 i c g
 Cerceris vagula Kohl, 1906 i c g
 Cerceris vanduzeei Banks, 1917 i c g
 Cerceris varicincta Cameron, 1905 i c g
 Cerceris varipes F. Smith, 1858 i c g
 Cerceris vechti Krombein, 1969 i c g
 Cerceris vegeta Arnold, 1940 i c g
 Cerceris vellensis Krombein, 1969 i c g
 Cerceris velutina Taschenberg, 1875 i c g
 Cerceris ventricornis Reyes, 1988 i c g
 Cerceris ventripilosa Empey, 1972 i c g
 Cerceris venusta F. Smith, 1873 i c g
 Cerceris verecunda Arnold, 1958 i c g
 Cerceris verhoeffi Tsuneki, 1961 i c g
 Cerceris vernayi Arnold, 1935 i c g
 Cerceris versicolor Schrottky, 1909 i c g
 Cerceris verticalis F. Smith, 1856 i c g
 Cerceris vespiformis de Saussure, 1855 c g
 Cerceris vianai Fritz and Toro, 1969 i c g
 Cerceris vicaria Shestakov, 1915 i c g
 Cerceris vicina Cresson, 1865 i c g
 Cerceris vicinoides Viereck and Cockerell, 1904 i c g
 Cerceris victori Genaro, 2009 i c g
 Cerceris victrix R. Turner, 1910 i c g
 Cerceris vierecki Banks, 1947 i c g
 Cerceris vigilans F. Smith, 1856 i c g
 Cerceris villiersi Berland, 1950 i c g
 Cerceris violaceipennis Cameron, 1904 i c g
 Cerceris vischnu Cameron, 1890 i c g
 Cerceris vittata Lepeletier, 1845 i c g
 Cerceris vitticollis F. Morawitz, 1894 i c g
 Cerceris vulcanica van-der Vecht, 1964 g
 Cerceris vulcanica van der Vecht, 1964 i c
 Cerceris vulpecula Empey, 1971 i c g
 Cerceris vulpinides Strand, 1910 i c g
 Cerceris waltoni Arnold, 1940 i c g
 Cerceris watlingensis Elliott and Salbert, 1979 i c g
 Cerceris wickwari R. Turner, 1912 i c g
 Cerceris willineri Fritz, 1960 i c g
 Cerceris willinki Fritz, 1983 i c g
 Cerceris windorum Tsuneki, 1968 i c g
 Cerceris wroughtoni Cameron, 1890 i c g
 Cerceris wyomingensis Scullen, 1965 i c g
 Cerceris xanthogaster Arnold, 1942 i c g
 Cerceris xanthosoma Yamane and Tano, 1995 i c g
 Cerceris xanthostigma Arnold, 1945 i c g
 Cerceris xanthura Evans, 1982 c g
 Cerceris xosa Brauns, 1926 i c g
 Cerceris yalensis R. Turner, 1913 i c g
 Cerceris yenpingensis Tsuneki, 1968 i c g
 Cerceris yngvei Cameron, 1908 i c g
 Cerceris yunnanensis Tsuneki, 1968 i c g
 Cerceris yuwanensis Tsuneki, 1982 i c g
 Cerceris zacatecas Scullen, 1972 i c g
 Cerceris zain Fritz, 1990 i c g
 Cerceris zapoteca de Saussure, 1867 i c g
 Cerceris zavattarii Guiglia, 1939 i c g
 Cerceris zebra Guichard, 1993 i c g
 Cerceris zelichi Fritz and Mariluis, 1976 i c g
 Cerceris zhdankoi Kazenas, 2006 i c g
 Cerceris zhelochovtsevi Kazenas, 1984 i c g
 Cerceris zoellneri Sielfeld, 1971 i c g
 Cerceris zonalis F. Smith, 1852 i c g
 Cerceris zonata Cresson, 1865 i c g
 Cerceris zumpango Scullen, 1972 i c g

Data sources: i = ITIS, c = Catalogue of Life, g = GBIF, b = Bugguide.net

References

Cerceris